Overlander Falls is a waterfall on the Fraser River in Mount Robson Provincial Park, British Columbia, Canada. It is popular for kayakers.

The waterfall is named for the Overlanders expedition of 1862. A group of 175 men and 1 woman from Ontario travelled across the prairies and through the Rocky Mountains, intending to reach the Barkerville or Cariboo goldfields. Just west of Overlander Falls, the group split. About half continued down the Fraser River, eventually reaching Barkerville in late fall of 1862, but over a year had elapsed since Billy Barker's gold strike and there were no claims left to stake. The other half abandoned their dreams of gold and rafted down the North Thompson River to Fort Kamloops.

See also 
Rearguard Falls
Overlander Mountain

References

Waterfalls of British Columbia
Fraser River
Cariboo Land District